James Michael Sensibaugh (January 3, 1949 – March 31, 2021) was an American football safety in the National Football League. He played eight seasons for the Kansas City Chiefs (1971–1975) and the St. Louis Cardinals (1976–1978). Sensibaugh played college football at Ohio State, where he still holds the school record for interceptions in a career with 22 and in a season with 9.

References

1949 births
2021 deaths
Players of American football from Cincinnati
American football safeties
Ohio State Buckeyes football players
Kansas City Chiefs players
St. Louis Cardinals (football) players